Hyles biguttata is a moth of the family Sphingidae. It is known to be from Madagascar and Réunion.

The larvae feed on Agarista salicifolia and Agarista buxifolia.

References

Hyles (moth)
Moths described in 1856
Moths of Madagascar
Lepidoptera of Réunion
Moths of Africa